The 413th Fighter-Interceptor Squadron is an inactive United States Air Force unit.  Its last assignment was with the 28th Air Division, stationed at Travis AFB, California.   It was inactivated on 18 August 1955.

History
Combat in Western Pacific, 13 July – 14 August 1945.  Air Defense of central West Coast; 1954–1955.

Lineage
 Constituted 413th Fighter Squadron on 5 October 1944
 Activated on 15 October 1944
 Inactivated on 30 September 1946
 Redesignated 413th Fighter-Interceptor Squadron on 23 March 1953
 Activated on 8 July 1954
 Inactivated on 18 August 1955.

Assignments
 414th Fighter Group, 15 October 1944 – 30 September 1946
 28th Air Division, 8 July 1954 – 18 August 1955.

Stations
 Seymour Johnson Field, North Carolina, 15 October 1944
 Selfridge Field, Michigan, 20 November 1944
 Bluethenthal Field, North Carolina, 19 March – 5 June 1945
 North Field, Iwo Jima, 7 July 1945
 Clark Field, Luzon, 23 December 1945
 Floridablanca Airfield, Luzon, unknown-30 September 1946
 Travis AFB, California, 8 July 1954 – 18 August 1955.

Aircraft
 P-47 Thunderbolt, 1944–1946
 F-86D Sabre Interceptor, 1954–1955

References

 *

External links

438